Staples Municipal Airport  is a city-owned public-use airport located two nautical miles (3.7 km) northwest of the central business district of the City of Staples, in Wadena County, Minnesota, United States.

Facilities and aircraft 
It has one runway designated 14/32 with a asphalt surface measuring 3,305 by 75 feet (1007 x 23 m).

In 2010 the Arrival-Departure Building was remodeled.

History 
In 2020 the airport received a $30,000 CARES Act award.

References

External links 

Airports in Minnesota
Transportation in Wadena County, Minnesota
Buildings and structures in Wadena County, Minnesota
Airports established in 1946
1946 establishments in Minnesota